Will Any Gentleman? is a 1950 stage farce by the British writer Vernon Sylvaine. The play was first performed at the Royal Court Theatre in Liverpool in July 1950. It then went on to the West End, running for 364 performances at the Stand Theatre between September 1950 and July 1951. It starred Robertson Hare, who appeared in several plays by Sylvaine. Hare plays a mild-mannered bank clerk who, after a night out, is hypnotized into a much more assertive lifestyle.

Original cast
Mendoza - Norman Scace
Alfred Boyle - Wilfred Boyle
Henry Stirling - Robertson Hare
Dr. Smith - Charles Groves
Detective-Inspector Martin - Henry Caine
Charley Stirling - Arthur Riscoe
Stanley Jackson - Hugh Metcalfe
Montague Billing - Gerard Clifton
Dancer - Patricia Dare
Angel - Thelma Grigg
Beryl - Natalie Raine
Florence Stirling - Constance Lorne
Honey - Pamela Deeming
Mrs. Whittle - Ruth Maitland

Film adaptation

In 1953 the play was adapted into a film directed by Michael Anderson. George Cole replaced Robertson Hare in the leading role.

References

Bibliography
 Wearing, J.P. The London Stage 1950-1959: A Calendar of Productions, Performers, and Personnel. Rowman & Littlefield, 2014.

1950 plays
British plays adapted into films
Plays by Vernon Sylvaine
Plays set in London
Comedy plays
West End plays